The athletics events at the 2005 Southeast Asian Games were held at the Rizal Memorial Sports Complex in Malate, Manila, Philippines. The Marathon event was run from the Diosdado Macapagal Boulevard, Pasay, Philippines on December 4, 2005.

Medal table

Medalists

Men

Women

Games Records
Women's High Jump: Vietnam's Bui Thi Nhung, 1.89m
(previous record of 1.88m was set in 1997 by Thailand's Achalach Kerdchang)
Women's Pole Vault: Malaysia's Rosalinda Samsu, 4.1m
(previous record of ? was set in ? by ?)
Women's 800m: Vietnam's Do Thi Bong - 2’03’’65 
(previous record of 2’03’’75 was set in 1985 by Thailand's Sasithorn Chanthanuhong.)
 Women's 1500m: Vietnam's Truong Thanh Hang - 4'18’’50
(previous record of 4'19’’42 was set in 2003 by Vietnam's Nguyen Lan Anh.)
 Men's Long Jump: Philippines' Henry Dagmil, 7.81m
(previous record of 7.79m was set in 1997 by Malaysia's Mohd Zaki Sadri)
 Men's hammer Throw: Philippines' Arniel Ferrera, Score:60.47
(previous record of 58.80 s was set in 1993 by Indonesia's Dudung Suhendri)

See also
2005 in athletics (track and field)

External links
Southeast Asian Games Official Results

Athletics
2005
Southeast Asian Games
2005 Southeast Asian Games